Unquatornoceras is an extinct cephalopod genus from the Late Devonian belonging to the ammonoid order Goniatitida.

References

 J.J.Sepkoski's list of Cephalopod genera  
Unquatornoceras in the Paleobiology database.

Goniatitida genera
Tornoceratidae
Late Devonian ammonites